Lakkoskiti is the short form name of a small "monastic village" of not more than 15 "huts" (houses) consisting the idiorrhythmic "skete of Agiou Dimitriou tou Lakkou". It is situated in the north foothills of Mount Athos, in Greece, in the Morfonou River valley and surrounded by a forest of chestnut trees. The summit of Antiathonas (1042 m) is located just to the southwest of the skete. Lakkoskiti is inhabited by Romanian monks.

Lakkoskiti belongs to Agiou Pavlou (Greek: Αγίου Παύλου, English: Saint Paul) Monastery. Spiritually, through its mother monastery, and like all the Athos peninsula, it is under the jurisdiction of the Ecumenical Patriarchate of Constantinople.

History 
Very little is known about the history of Romanian Lakkoskiti. Monks were living there since the 10th century, belonging to the old Amalfinon Monastery which was soon abandoned and ruined, after the Schism between Eastern Orthodox and Western Roman Catholic Church in 1054 AD. In the 14th century some Serbs borrowed money from Vatopediou Monastery to revive the place but failed to pay it back. So later Vatopediou Monastery, after a deal with Agiou Pavlou Monastery, exchanged the land with other properties. Inscriptions of 1606 AD show that there were Slavs living there while in 1754 the monks are documented as Moldavians (from the Principality of Moldavia, one of the two predecessors of modern Romania). In 1760, Moldavian monk Daniel from Neamț Monastery organized it as Skete.

After the Greek Revolution of 1821 Moldavians and Wallachians (from the Principality of Wallachia, the other predecessors of modern Romania which eventually united with Moldavia) stopped coming to Greece, as the situation was dangerous, while older monks returned home or died. Later new monks started coming again and Lakkoskiti received up to 90 monks in 24 huts. A new wider Kyriako (central church) of Saint Demetrios was built on the expenses of monk Ioustinos, along with a second church at the cemetery and a water-mill. The Moldavian and Wallachian monks had constantly financial support from their government but lived there quietly without creating any political/ethnic problems.

Lakkoskiti, being in a place hardly approachable, declined again slowly. In mid 1990s, when only one old monk was left, a new effort started with a new brotherhood, coming partially from the Romanian coenobitic Timiou Prodromou Skete and partially from Romania. Kyriakon and the huts were slowly rebuilt, the forest dirtroad was improved and more monks were added, under the guidance of geron Stefanos. As Lakkoskiti is far from the main roads, pilgrims-visitors are rare and the Romanian monks are really very attentive to them.

List of cells
Some cells in the main area of the skete include:

Sotir
Kyriakon Agios Dimitrios
Ag. Artemios
Evangelismou tis Theotokou
Eisodion tis Theotokou
Zoodochiou Pigis
Panton Athioniton Agion
Agiou Antoniou
Ag. Skepis
Ag. Nikolaou
Kimiseos Theotokou
Analipseos tou Kyriou
Ag. Archangeli
Geniseos Theotokou
Profiti Ilia
Ypapantis Christou

See also
 Mount Athos
 Agiou Pavlou, the monastery Lakkoskiti belongs to
 Prodromos Skete, the other Romanian establishment on the Mountain

Notes

Bibliography
 "Sfântul Munte Athos - Grădina Maicii Domnului" (Holy Mountain Athos - The Garden of Theotokos), 2nd edition, by monk Pimen Vlad, St. Martyr Artemios cell, Lakkoskete, Holy Mount Athos.

Romanian Orthodox monasteries outside Romania
Sketes in Mount Athos
Agiou Pavlou Monastery